Xanthorhoe semifissata, commonly known as the Barred Pink Looper, is a moth of the family Geometridae. It is endemic to New Zealand and is found throughout the country although it is much less common in the mountains in the south and west of the South Island. The larvae host plants include Nasturtium officinale as well as species in the Cardamine genus. Adult moths inhabit shrubs at the edge of native forest.

Taxonomy
This species was first described by Francis Walker in 1862 using specimens collected in Nelson by T. R. Oxley and named Cohemia semifissata. In 1939 Louis Beethoven Prout placed this species in the genus Larentia. In 1971 J. S. Dugdale placed this species in the genus Helastia. The genus Helastia was restricted by Craw in 1987 placing this species into the genus Xanthorhoe. This placement was accepted in 1988 by Dugdale. The lectotype specimen is held at the Natural History Museum, London.

Description

George Hudson described this species in 1898 as follows:

Distribution and habitat 
This species is found in the North and South Islands of New Zealand as well as on Stewart Island. However this species is not common in the south and west mountains of the South Island. X. semifissata has been collected in Riccarton Bush, Christchurch.

The preferred habitat of this species is edge of forests. The hosts for the larvae of this moth are herbaceous plants. Gaskin noted eggs are laid on watercress (Nasturtium officinale). White listed Cardamine and stream Nasturtium as known larval foods.

Life cycle

Eggs 
Eggs are pale green and hemispherical in shape.

Larva 

The caterpillar is dark brown on its upper side and light brown below, When fully grown it is approximately 2.5 cm long.

Pupa 
This species pupates in the leaf litter under the host plant.

Adult 
Gaskin hypothesised that this species has two broods, the first in spring and early summer and the second in late summer. It is possible that the second may overwinter. The adults have been collected in March, May, August and October in Riccarton Bush, Christchurch.  In the montane grasslands at Arthur's Pass, this moth was seen from November through to April.

References 

semifissata
Moths of New Zealand
Moths described in 1862
Endemic fauna of New Zealand
Taxa named by Francis Walker (entomologist)
Endemic moths of New Zealand